Kedar and Qedar may refer to:

Indian subcontinent
Shiva or Kedar, a Hindu god
Panch Kedar, five Hindu temples or holy places of the Shaivite sect dedicated to god Shiva
Kedar (raga), a raga in Indian classical music named after Lord Shiva
Kedaram, a raga in Carnatic music (South Indian classical music)

Middle East
Kedar, Gush Etzion, an Israeli settlement east of Jerusalem near Maale Adummim named after Qedar/Kedar
Qedar or Kedar, the second son of Ishmael
Qedarites, an Arab tribal confederation

People with the surname
Benjamin Z. Kedar (born 1938), Israeli historian
Mordechai Kedar, Israeli scholar of Arabic literature